Bonshaw is a village in New South Wales, Australia 783 km north of Sydney. It is located near the northern border of the State close to Texas, Queensland, from which it is separated by the Dumaresq River which forms the border between the states. Bonshaw is located in Inverell Shire and Arrawatta County. It is on the Bruxner Highway between Tenterfield and Goondiwindi. It is a village designed to serve the needs of the agricultural holdings in the area.

Bonshaw Post Office opened on 1 October 1866 and closed around 1994.

References

External links
 Bonshaw, includes some photos

Towns in New South Wales
Towns in New England (New South Wales)
Inverell Shire